Daan District (or Da-an District, Da'an District) is an important educational, commercial, residential and cultural district of Taipei City, Republic of China (Taiwan). The name of the district means "great safety" or "great peace".

History 
The district is named after Daiwan village that was once located near the intersection of present-day Xinyi Road and Fuxing S. Road. The name was changed in the 1800s (during the Qing era) to the more auspicious but similar-sounding "Daan".

In 1945, after World War II, Daan District was drawn from an area centered on Daan village and took its name. Further significant changes occurred in the 1990s.

Geography 
Daan is bounded on the east by Guangfu South Road, Keelung Road and Heping East Road; on the south by Neipu, Fuzhou and Toad Hills, and the Xinhai and Zhuangjing Tunnels; in the west by Roosevelt Road, Hangzhou South Road, Xinyi Road and Xinsheng South Road; and in the north by Civic Boulevard. It is bordered by Xinyi District to the east, Wenshan District to the south, Zhongzheng District to the west, Zhongshan District to the northwest, and Songshan District to the northeast.

Government institutions

 Industrial Development Bureau
 Maritime and Port Bureau
 Ministry of Science and Technology
 Securities and Futures Bureau
 Small and Medium Enterprise Administration
 Taiwan Intellectual Property Office
 Transitional Justice Commission

Education 
Daan is the home of three major national universities: National Taiwan University (NTU), National Taiwan University of Science and Technology and National Taiwan Normal University (NTNU). The former two universities have strong engineering programs, and NTU also has a highly regarded medical school located in the Zhongzheng District.

The National Taipei University of Technology, National Taipei University of Education and Affiliated Senior High School of National Taiwan Normal University are also in this district.

For learners of Chinese as a foreign language, Daan hosts a number of popular language centers including TMI's Taiwan Mandarin Institute, NTU's International Chinese Language Program and NTNU's Mandarin Training Center.

Shopping 
Daan has numerous shopping areas. On Zhongxiao East Road, Dunhua South Road and neighboring alleys, there are clothing shops, restaurants serving world cuisines, and major department stores including three branches of the Pacific Sogo Department Store, Breeze Center, the Ming Yao Department Store, and the immense 24-hour Eslite Bookstore. The East Metro Market runs underneath Zhongxiao Road between metro stations. Specialty markets include the Jianguo Holiday Flower Market, the Jianguo Holiday Jade Market, and the Guanghua Computer and Electronics Market.

Daan's most famous night markets are the Tonghua Night Market, in the east of the district, and the Shida Night Market in the west, near NTNU.  Because of its proximity to NTNU and NTU, the Shida Night Market area is known as a student hangout and is filled with foreign restaurants and student-oriented bars.  Yongkang Street, another popular restaurant area and home to the original Din Tai Fung restaurant, lies to the north of NTNU. Located near NTU is also the Wistaria Tea House, a quiet historic teahouse serving tea in the Gongfu style.

Residential 
Daan also offers some of Taipei's most expensive residential real estate, clustered around the tree-lined Dunhua South Road, Anhe Road and Ren'ai Road areas (known as the East District). As of 2009, Guangfu Road had the highest residential land value. In this area there are upscale fashion boutiques, elite retail shops and many of Taipei's renowned "lounge bars".

Other places of interest 
Other notable places include the Daan Forest Park, which was built on land formerly occupied by military officers and their families, and the Taipei Municipal Library. The park occupies an area of 26 hectares and includes an amphitheater, concrete roller- and inline-skating rink, ponds, pavilions, paths, and two underground parking lots. The park also has a popular playground for children. The Mongolian and Tibetan Cultural Center, Workshop of Advanced Academy of Agronomy and Forestry, Jut Art Museum, Taiwan Contemporary Culture Lab, Taipei Hakka Culture Hall, Wistaria Tea House, Mind Set Art Center, Wang Yun-wu Memorial Hall, and Fanglan Mansion, and many other tourist attractions are also located in Daan District. Museums in Daan District are Museum of Archives, Museum of National Taipei University of Education and Museum of Zoology.

Transportation 
Daan is served by the Taipei Metro. The Wenhu line, Bannan line, Songshan-Xindian line, Tamsui-Xinyi line, and Zhonghe-Xinlu line all have stations in the district, nineteen stations of which are located in the district: Sun Yat-Sen Memorial Hall, Zhongxiao Dunhua, Zhongxiao Fuxing, Zhongxiao Xinsheng, Daan Park, Daan, Xinyi Anhe, Technology Building, Liuzhangli, Linguang, Dongmen, Guting, Taipower Building and Gongguan.

Notable people 
 Jolin Tsai (born 1980), Taiwanese singer-songwriter, lives in Daan
 Dee Hsu (born 1978), Taiwanese singer, actress, and television host, lives in Daan

References

External links 

 
 About Daan District (City of Taipei)

Districts of Taipei
Shopping districts and streets in Taiwan